This article provides a timeline of the Ottoman Empire

This timeline is incomplete; some important events may be missing. Please help add to it.

14th  century

15th century

16th century

17th century

18th century

19th century

20th century

See also
 Outline of the Ottoman Empire
List of Ottoman sieges and landings
Timeline of Turks (500-1300)
Timeline of the Seljuk Sultanate of Rûm
List of Ottoman Empire territories
List of cities conquered by the Ottoman Empire
Timeline of Ottoman Syria history

Bibliography

See also
Rise of the Ottoman Empire
Kayı tribe
Socioeconomics of Enlargement Era (Ottoman Empire)
Classical Age of the Ottoman Empire
Classical Age of the Ottoman Empire
Transformation of the Ottoman Empire
Stagnation of the Ottoman Empire
Decline of the Ottoman Empire

References

Turkic timelines
History of the Ottoman Empire
Ottoman Empire-related lists